The 12933 / 12934 Karnavati Superfast Express is one of four express trains belonging to Indian Railways that offer Chair Car services between  (ADI) and  (MMCT) in India. It operates as train number 12934 from Ahmedabad Junction to Mumbai Central and as train number 12933 in the reverse direction, serving the states of Maharashtra & Gujarat.

The other Chair Car trains which run between the two cities are 12931/32 Mumbai Central–Ahmedabad Double Decker Express, 22953/54 Gujarat Superfast Express and the 12009/10 Mumbai Central–Ahmedabad Shatabdi Express.

Karnavati was the name of a city that existed where Ahmedabad stands today. That was before the Mughal period.

Coaches

Karnavati Superfast Express is composed of four AC Chair Cars, 14 2nd Class seating cars, 2 General Unreserved coaches, 1 Pantry car and two 2 Luggage Cum Generator coaches. The conventional rakes were replaced by Linke-Hofmann Busch (LHB) coaches for this train in 2014.

As with most train services in India, coach composition may be amended at the discretion of Indian Railways depending on demand.

Service

12934 Karnavati Superfast Express covers the distance of 491 kilometres in 7 hours 40 mins (at an average speed of 64.04 km/h).
The reverse trip, as 12933 Karnavati Superfast Express needs 7 hours 45 mins (at an average speed of 63.35 km/h).

As the average speed of the train is more than 55 km/h, its fare includes a Superfast surcharge.

Traction

Prior to Western Railways switching over to the AC system in February 2012, dual-traction WCAM-1 or WCAM-2/2P locos would haul the train.

Since Western Railway has switched over to the AC system it is hauled from end to end by a Vadodara-based WAP-7 (HOG)-equipped locomotive.

Time Table

12934 Karnavati Superfast Express leaves Ahmedabad Junction at 04:55 AM IST every day and reaches Mumbai Central at 12:35 PM IST the same day.
12933 Karnavati Superfast Express leaves Mumbai Central at 13:40 PM IST every day and reaches Ahmedabad Junction at 21:25 PM IST the same day.

Route & Halts

 
 
 
 
 
 
 
 
 
 
 

Note:- No Halt for Maninagar as 12934 Ahmedabad–Mumbai Central Karnavati Superfast Express

Gallery

Sister trains
 Gujarat Queen
 Gujarat Mail
 Mumbai Central–Ahmedabad Double Decker Express
 Mumbai Central–Ahmedabad Passenger
 Mumbai Central–Ahmedabad Shatabdi Express

External links

Mumbai–Ahmedabad trains
Express trains in India
Railway services introduced in 1991
Named passenger trains of India
Rail transport in Gujarat
Rail transport in Maharashtra